Proctor (also referred to as Austinville or Proctors) is an unincorporated community in northwestern Wetzel County, West Virginia, United States.  It lies on West Virginia Route 2 along the Ohio River, north of the city of New Martinsville, the county seat of Wetzel County.  Its elevation is 630 feet (192 m).  Because the community has borne multiple names, the Board on Geographic Names officially designated it "Proctor" in 1980.  It has a post office with the ZIP code 26055.

The community was named after a pioneer settler named Proctor.

See also

 List of cities and towns along the Ohio River

References

Unincorporated communities in Wetzel County, West Virginia
Unincorporated communities in West Virginia
West Virginia populated places on the Ohio River